Beer is a popular beverage in Serbia.

History
The beer was first mentioned in the 15th century during the reign of despot Stefan Lazarević, as a new drink transferred from neighboring Kingdom of Hungary. It was cooked in households, taverns, and even in the residence of the despot. Its popularity rose several centuries later and industrial-scale production began in the mid-18th century.

Production, packaging and consumption
Serbian breweries produce 523 million liters annually, which place country as 43rd largest beer producer in the world. Serbia exports some 138 million liters annually, mainly to neighboring countries, such as Bosnia and Herzegovina (79 million L), Bulgaria (22.3 million L), Montenegro (12.7 million L),  Hungary (12.4 million L) or Croatia (11.9 million L), and to a minor extent to countries where there is significant Serbian diaspora, such as the Germany, Austria, United States and Canada.

Beer for home consumption is mostly sold in 0.5-liter bottles of deposit type (reused) and 0.33-liter glass bottles, as well as cans. Most breweries began packing their product in plastic Q-pack bottles of 1.5, 2 or even 2.5 litres. In bars and restaurants, beer is either served in 0.33L or 0.5L bottles or as "draught" (točeno).

Serbia ranks 38th by beer consumption per capita, with 60 litres a year.

Breweries and brands

Breweries
There are three main breweries in Serbia which combined, control 95% of market share. These are: Apatin Brewery, Heineken Srbija and Carlsberg Srbija. The remaining of market share is controlled by domestic breweries Valjevo Brewery, BIP Brewery, Jagodina Brewery and Niš Brewery and 20 other minor breweries.

Most popular domestic brand is Jelen, followed by Lav. Some foreign brands are distributed, while some are produced locally under license (mostly by its respective brand owners).

Pale lager has been the traditional beer choice for Serbians, and dark lager, while being popular, is produced in smaller quantities. Some breweries produce kvass.

Brands

Domestic
 Apatin Brewery (Jelen, Apatinsko, Jelen Cool, Jelen Fresh)
 Čelarevo Brewery (Lav, Merak)
 Novi Sad Brewery (Pils Plus, MB, Master)
  (Zaječarsko, Zaječarsko crno)
  (Valjevsko)
 BIP Brewery (BIP, Bg)
  (Jagodinsko)
  (Niško)

Foreign
 Apatin Brewery (Beck's, Stella Artois, Staropramen, Nikšićko)
 Čelarevo Brewery (Carlsberg, Tuborg, Holsten)
 Novi Sad Brewery (Heineken, Amstel)

Beer festivals

Belgrade Beer Fest

Started in 2003, Belgrade Beer Fest is held annually over 3–4 days at the foot of Belgrade's Kalemegdan fortress as a showcase event for various beer producers. In addition to domestic and foreign brews at affordable prices, the festival features live music performances each evening. It has quickly grown in size and popularity. On 31 December 2005 British daily The Independent named it as one of the worldwide events to visit in 2006.

Dani piva
Dani Piva (Beer Days) is a beer festival in Zrenjanin, started in 1985, organised by the Zrenjanin brewery (Zrenjaninska industrija piva).

See also
 Beer and breweries by region

References

External links

 Efes Weifert: Manji gubici za 22% at b92.net 

 
Serbian cuisine